|}

The Burradon Stakes is a Listed flat horse race in Great Britain open to three-year-old horses. It is run at Newcastle over a distance of 1 mile and 5 yards (1,614 metres), and it is scheduled to take place each year in March or April at the course's Good Friday meeting.

The race was first run in 2017 as a conditions race and was named after the nearby village of Burradon. It was upgraded to Listed status from the 2018 running, effectively replacing the International Trial in the calendar. In 2018 it also became part of the Road to the Kentucky Derby series through which horses earn points to qualify for a place in the Kentucky Derby. The Burradon Stakes was the final race of the European leg of the series and carried the most qualifying points of any of the European races. It was replaced in the 2019 Road to the Kentucky Derby series by the Cardinal Stakes at Chelmsford City.

Winners

See also 
 Horse racing in Great Britain
 List of British flat horse races

References 

Racing Post:

Flat races in Great Britain
Newcastle Racecourse
Flat horse races for three-year-olds
Recurring sporting events established in 2017
2017 establishments in England